Hulmadian may refer to:
 Hulmadian-e Bala
 Hulmadian-e Pain